The National Jewish Sports Hall of Fame and Museum, in Commack, New York, is dedicated to honoring American Jewish figures who have distinguished themselves in sports.

Its objective is to foster Jewish identity through athletics, and to commemorate sports heroes who have emerged from a people not commonly associated with sports.

The Hall has inductees in the sports of American football, auto-racing, baseball, basketball, bicycling, bowling, boxing, Canadian football, canoeing, cycling, discus, dressage, fencing, figure skating, golf, gymnastics, handball, horse showing, horse-racing, ice hockey, judo, karate, lacrosse, marathon running, pole vault, racquetball, rowing, rugby, shot put, skiing, soccer (European football), softball, squash, swimming, tennis, track, triathlete, volleyball, weightlifting, and wrestling. It has also inducted authors, broadcasters, columnists, and sportscasters.

The first annual induction ceremony was held on March 21, 1993.

Inductees

Awards

In addition to inducted Hall of Fame members, it presents periodic awards as follows:

The Marty Glickman Outstanding Jewish (College) Scholastic Athlete of the Year

Awarded to Charles Altchek (soccer), Yael Averbuch (soccer), Cliff Bayer (fencing), Matt Bernstein (football), Shay Doron (basketball), Hayden Epstein (football), David Ettinger (football), Jay Fiedler (football), Loren Galler Rabinowitz (figure skating), Rebekah Green (shot put), Bess Greenberg (basketball), Elvis M. Sternberg (gymnastics), Dan Grunfeld (basketball), Damion Hahn (wrestling), Sada Jacobson (fencing), Dan Helmer (gymnastics), Anita Kaplan (basketball), Brie Katz (volleyball), Chad Levitt (football), Jessica Levy (volleyball), Samantha Marder (softball), Boyd Melson (boxer), Neil Ravitz (football), Amy Rosson (softball), Rebekah Rottenberg (lacrosse), Mike Saffer (football), Jon Scheyer (basketball), Laine Selwyn (basketball), and Marc Siegel (ice hockey).

In 2011, football player Gabe Carimi was awarded the Marty Glickman Award.

The Jules D. & Pearl D. Mazor Awards to the Outstanding Jewish High School Scholar Athletes of the Year

Awarded to Adam Balkan (baseball), Stephanie Barnet (squash), Ben Belmont (lacrosse), Rachel Blume (softball), Dannielle Diamant (basketball), Hillary Framson (soccer), Zachary Greenberg (basketball), Ben Herman (swimming), Emily Jacobson (fencing), David Kahn (swimming), Jesse Koller (soccer), Jarryd Levine (soccer), Max Levine (baseball), Jason Liberman (basketball), Sarah Lowenthal (gymnastics), Adam Mahfouda (lacrosse), Samantha Marder (softball), David Posner (lacrosse), Chad Prince (soccer), Jon Scheyer (basketball), Jodi Schlesinger (track), Justin Simon (basketball), Mark Wohlstadter (football), and Courtney Zale (basketball).

The Dick Steinberg Good Guy Award
Awarded to Andy Bloom (shot put), Ron Carner (executive), Dave Cohen (football coach), Gerald Eskenazi (columnist), Jay Fiedler (football), Ken Fiedler (basketball coach), Stan Fischler (broadcasting), Alan Freedman (executive), Nicole Freedman (bicycling), Margie Goldstein-Engle (horse showing), Stan Isaacs (columnist), James Jacobs (handball), Steve Jacobson (columnist), Barry Landers (broadcaster), Nancy Moloff (wheelchair discus), Arthur Richman (baseball writer & executive),  Marty Riger (basketball coach), Dick Steinberg (football general manager), Herb Turetzky (basketball), Lisa Winston (columnist) and Boyd Melson (boxer and humanitarian).

The George Young Award
The George Young Award is given to the person, Jewish or non-Jewish, who "has best exemplified the high ideals that George Young displayed".

It has been awarded to Ernie Accorsi (football), Lou Carnesecca (basketball), Preston Robert Tisch (football), George Young (football) and James Metzger (lacrosse).

Advisory Committee
Among those serving on its Advisory Committee are Marty Appel, Len Berman, Howard David, Ernie Grunfeld and Paul Zimmerman.

Other Jewish sports halls of fame in the U.S.
Jewish Sports Hall of Fame of Northern California
Southern California Jewish Sports Hall of Fame
Orange County Jewish Sports Hall of Fame (California)
Michigan Jewish Sports Hall of Fame
Rochester Jewish Sports Hall of Fame (N.Y.)
Jewish Sports Hall of Fame of Western Pennsylvania
Philadelphia Jewish Sports Hall of Fame (Pennsylvania)

See also
List of Jewish American sportspeople
List of Jews in sports
International Jewish Sports Hall of Fame
Jewish Coaches Association
Jewish Sports Review

References

Jewish-American sports history

Lists of Jews
Jewish sports organizations
Jewish museums in New York (state)
Sports museums in New York (state)
Museums in Suffolk County, New York
Jewish
All-sports halls of fame
United States sport-related lists
Huntington, New York
Smithtown, New York
Awards established in 1993
Jews and Judaism in Suffolk County, New York
Jewish Sports Hall of Fame

Why isn’t Johnny Most. Former announcer of the Boston Celtics or Robert K Kraft owner of the 7 time Super Bowl Champion New England Patriots in the Hall of Fame.